David Murray Quested (born 16 April 1946) is a former New Zealand cricket umpire. He stood in five Test matches between 1995 and 2001 and 31 ODI games between 1992 and 2002.

See also
 List of Test cricket umpires
 List of One Day International cricket umpires

References

1946 births
Living people
People from Christchurch
New Zealand Test cricket umpires
New Zealand One Day International cricket umpires